The Life of the Mind in America: From the Revolution to the Civil War is a book by Perry Miller It won the 1966 Pulitzer Prize for History.

References 

1965 non-fiction books
Pulitzer Prize for History-winning works
American history books
History books about the American Civil War
American political books
Harcourt (publisher) books